Brigadier Robert Arthur Phayre DSO (4 January 1901 – 31 December 1993) was a British soldier and cricketer.

Biography

After playing Minor counties cricket for Oxfordshire in 1922 and 1923 he began to serve in the Army, playing cricket whilst stationed overseas. In 1924 he played for the Straits Settlements against the Federated Malay States and for Malaya against Shanghai and Hong Kong, and in 1929, played two first-class matches in India.

His cricket career ended in 1930 with two final matches for Oxfordshire and he served in World War II, during which he was awarded the Distinguished Service Order for his part in the D-Day landings.

In 1973 he was appointed a Knight of the order of the Hospital of Saint John of Jerusalem

Family

He was the son of Major-General Sir Arthur Phayre (1856–1940) - a nephew of Lt-General Arthur Purves Phayre - and Catherine Mary née Anderson (18668–1917).

References

1901 births
1993 deaths
British Army personnel of World War II
Companions of the Distinguished Service Order
Malayan cricketers
Royal Artillery officers
Straits Settlements cricketers
Oxfordshire cricketers
Europeans cricketers